East Keswick is a civil parish in the metropolitan borough of the City of Leeds, West Yorkshire, England.  The parish contains nine listed buildings that are recorded in the National Heritage List for England. All the listed buildings are designated at Grade II, the lowest of the three grades, which is applied to "buildings of national importance and special interest".  The parish contains the village of East Keswick and the surrounding countryside.  The listed buildings consist of houses, farmhouses and farm buildings, a public house, and two milestones.


Buildings

References

Citations

Sources

Lists of listed buildings in West Yorkshire